A Stellar Award is an award presented by SAGMA to recognize achievements in the gospel music industry. The annual presentation ceremony features performances by prominent gospel artists, and the presentation of those awards that have a more popular interest. The Stellars are the first of the Big Two major gospel music awards held annually.

The first Stellar Awards ceremony was held on 1984, to honor and respect the musical accomplishments by gospel performers for the year 1983. Following the 2018 ceremony, SAGMA overhauled a few Stellar Award categories for 2019.

In 2020, the awards show was canceled due to the COVID-19 pandemic. The ceremony was aired virtually on August 23, 2020. Jekalyn Carr later hosted the "Stellar Tribute to the Holidays", which aired on local channels and on UPtv, Aspire TV, and Bounce TV..

History 

The first award ceremony was held at Arie Crown Theater in Chicago in 1984. Over the years, The Stellars have been held in various locations including  Atlanta, Houston, Los Angeles, Las Vegas, Nashville, and New York. Starting from the 30th Annual Stellar Awards in 2015, the show has been held at the Orleans Arena in Las Vegas, and airing on American digital cable and satellite television network TV One. Starting with the 34th annual ceremony in 2019, the Stellar Awards moved its annual broadcast to BET. The number of awards given have also changed over the years with categories added and removed.
The Stellars were produced in 1970 by Don Jackson's Chicago-based Central City Productions. The production company is also a distributor of original programming to television and cable networks. In the spring of 2000, Central City Productions changed the voting process by creating the Stellar Awards Gospel Music Academy (SAGMA). SAGMA is currently the official voting body for the Stellar Awards. The Academy is open to record company executives, artists, radio announcers, gospel industry professionals and supporters.

Entry process and selection of nominees 
Media companies registered with the Stellar Awards Gospel Music Academy and individual members of SAGMA (artists and other professionals working in the industry who meet certain criteria) may enter recordings for consideration, along with an entry form. Record Companies and artists enter recordings and music videos online released during the eligibility period that charted in the top 25 on at least two Nielsen Charts for at least four weeks. Entries are made online and two physical copies of the work is sent to SAGMA. Once a work is entered, submission go through a screening process. A confidential Nominating committee made up of music industry experts in various fields meet to insure that all entries meet the eligibility criteria, all entries are in the appropriate categories, that the entries are charting in the top 25 on the Nielsen Charts during the eligibility period, and are appropriate for the Stellar Awards. Each category is limited based on the dictate and discretion of the Stellar Awards Nomination Committee therefore all entries cannot be included on the ballot. Technical quality, lyrics, voice quality, charting duration, project content and charting performance will be reviewed for inclusion on the ballot. All Stellar Awards Nomination Committee selections are then finalized.

Final voting 
The voting process for narrowing down the final nominees consist of two separate ballots. The first round ballot includes eligible entries as determined by the Nominating Committee of SAGMA. Top entries for each category from the first ballot will move forward to the final ballot. During the final voting process, the general public (including fans) are the voting body for the second and final ballot to determine the Stellar Award winners. The nominees are announced during a press/radio tour.

Categories

Artist of the year
Song of the Year
Male Vocalist of the Year
Albertina Walker Female Vocalist of the Year
Duo/Chorus Group of the Year
New Artist of the Year
Musician of the Year
Album of the Year
Choir of the Year
Producer of the Year
Contemporary Duo/Chorus Group of the Year
Traditional Duo/Chorus Group of the Year
Contemporary male vocalist of the year
Traditional male vocalist of the year
Male Vocalist of the Year
Contemporary Female Vocalist of the Year
Urban/Inspirational single or performance of the year
Music Video of the Year
Traditional choir of the Year
Contemporary choir of the Year
Instrumental album of the Year
Special event album of the Year
Rap/Hip Hop gospel album of the year
Youth Project vocalist of the year
Quartet of the Year
Praise and worship album of the Year

Radio & Internet Station Awards

Gospel Radio Major Market of the Year
Gospel Radio Large Market of the Year
Gospel Radio Medium Market of the Year
Gospel Radio Small Market of the Year
Gospel Internet Station of the Year
Gospel announcer of the Year

Defunct award categories

Winner Milestones
Kirk Franklin was the night's big winner with six statues. Donald Lawrence presents the Tri-City
Singers received four Stellar Awards. John P. Kee's I Made It Out delivered three Stellar
Awards. Tasha Cobbs Leonard garnered two trophies, while Le'Andria Johnson earned two for
her work on Donald Lawrence's project, Goshen. The Walls Group received two statues for their
album Friend in Me, along with newcomer Pastor Mike Jr. who took home a pair of Stellar
Awards for his work on Live Free. Kurt Carr received two Stellar awards. Rounding out the
night with one Stellar Award each were JJ Hairston, Ben Tankard, Gospel Kids, Keith
Wonderboy Johnson and Greenleaf; Season 3.

Ceremonies

See also 

 List of religion-related awards

References

External links 

 

1970 establishments in the United States
American annual television specials
American music awards
Awards established in 1970
Christian music awards
Gospel music awards
Recurring events established in 1984